Shaun Baker is an English musician, DJ and record producer, currently based in Paderborn, Germany.

Musical career
Baker has been playing the worldwide club scene over 20 years. Together with his friend and partner Sebastian Wolter, he also produces music. This musical partnership has over the past few years given the dance scene songs such as "Xplode 2," which hit the number 1 position in every German dance chart at the same time. Other singles are "Push" (also a dance chart & sales hit) and "Bakerman", a co-op with the cult stars Laid Back from Denmark. Laid Back were so impressed with the new version of "Bakerman" they hooked Shaun Baker and Sebastian Wolter up with Lars von Trier, who produced the video clip for the original version of "Bakerman". He gave permission to use the original video for their version. It was No. 1 in most German dance charts again and the peak position in the German sale charts was 39. The next single "V.I.P.," released in February 2007, performed well in Germany but received higher results in Slovakia and the Czech Republic. "V.I.P." hit the No. 1 position in the dance, radio and sale charts in both countries. Late summer 2007 he and Sebastian Wolter found their own record label called Uptunes. The debut release from Uptunes was his next single "Power" which is based on the "Xplode" sound, but this time featuring vocals and made the peak position in various dance charts in Germany, Slovakia and the Czech Republic. "Power" also led the German dance download charts. His debut album 1 was released on 25 July 2008. The next single "Hey Hi Hello" featured a remix from Alex Christensen and was released first in Slovakia and the Czech Republic this spring and later in Germany and elsewhere.

In 2008 he took main theme song from Czech/East German fairytale movie Three Nuts for Cinderella written by songwriter Karel Svoboda and remixed it as song "Could You Would You Should You." There are mixed reactions to this, mainly due to the popularity of the original song.

Discography

Singles

References

External links 
 official Homepage
 official Booking Agency
 Sebastian Wolter

English DJs
Living people
Year of birth missing (living people)